Uqba ibn Abi Mu'ayt (died 624) was one of the principal adversaries of Islam. He was a Quraysh leader and a member of the Banu 'Abdu Shams clan of Quraish tribe.

Family

Family lineage 
‘Uqbah was the son of Abu Mu‘ayṭ ibn Abu ‘Amr ibn Umayyah ibn ‘Abd Shams and of Shayma bint Abd-al-Uzza from the Banu Amir. Abu Mu'ayt's mother was Kabsha bint Abd al-Manat from Banu Amir. Uqbah's aunt, Safiyya bint Abi ‘Amr, married Abu Sufyan.

Family marriage 
He married Arwa bint Kurayz, a member of the Abdshams clan and the widow of ‘Affān ibn Abu al-‘Āṣ, making Uqba the stepfather of the future Caliph Uthman, Abd-Allah and Amina. Uqba and Arwa had six children: Walid, Umara, Khalid, Umm Kulthum, Umm Hakim and Hind.

Role of 'Uqbah in opposing Muhammad 
Uqbah was one of the neighbors of Muhammad. Yet he assaulted Muhammad verbally and physically as he was preaching monotheism
He also constantly ridiculed Muhammad when the latter was preaching in Mecca. On one occasion, when Muhammad was praying in the courtyard of the Ka'ba, Uqba brought the waste of a slaughtered camel (intestines, blood, dung, etc.) upon the suggestion of other Quraysh leaders who were gathered there, and placed it upon Muhammad's back while he was in prostration. They laughed so much so that they fell on each other. He remained in that position due to the weight, unable to lift his head from prostration until his daughter came and removed it.

On another occasion, Uqba spat on Muhammad's face at the incitement of his friend Ubay ibn Khalaf and so, a Quranic verse  was revealed at that moment to Muhammad regarding Uqba and Ubay. Uqbah was also one of those enemies of Muhammad who rejoiced at the news of the death of Muhammad's second son 'Abdullah.

Ubayy ibn Khalaf ibn Safwan was a close friend of ‘Uqbah. When Ubayy learned that ‘Uqba had sat and listened to the apostle, he told ‘Uqbah, ‘Do I hear that you have sat with Muhammad and listened to him? I swear I will never see you or speak to you again if you do the same again, or if you do not go and spit in his face.’ ‘Uqba indeed did this so that Allah sent down concerning the pair of them:
“On the day that the sinner bites his hands, saying, would that I had chosen a path with the apostle.” (Sura 25: 27)

Death 
According to numerous authentic and trustworthy sources such as a number of narrations in Sahih Bukhari, and Ibn Sa'd's biographical compendium, the Tabaqat Al-Kubra, Uqba was killed in the field during the Battle of Badr and was among those Quraysh leaders whose corpses were buried in a pit.
According to Muslim scholar Safiur Rahman al-Mubarakpuri, after the Battle of Badr two captives – Nadr bin Harith and ‘Uqbah ibn Abū Mu‘ayṭ were beheaded by Ali. Mubarakpuri mentions that this incident about the beheading is also mentioned in the Sunan Abu Dawud no 2686 and Anwal Ma'bud 3/12.

See also 
 Non-Muslims who interacted with Muslims during Muhammad's era
 Persons related to Qur'anic verses

References 

Sahabah ancestors
624 deaths
7th-century executions
Banu Umayya
Year of birth unknown
Opponents of Muhammad